Monique Richard (born 1975) is a Canadian mountaineer.

Biography 

Born to an impoverished family in Montreal, Monique had a difficult childhood and lived with several foster families. During her childhood, she was subjected to physical and psychological violence. Early on, it was through sports that she learned to channel her anger and frustration, developing her passion and her taste for action and she quickly stood out by her talents, her performance and her physical abilities.

At 22 years old, she was full of energy and desire to discover the world. Often unemployed, or employed at minimum wage, she finished high school and spent her days in libraries where she discovered literature and the arts. Through books, she developed a great interest in Europe, culture and travel, but her situation  increased her feeling of helplessness and frustration. Not seeing the light at the end of the tunnel, she felt trapped, and she descended into a deep depression, to the point of thinking of ending her life.

That's when an unexpected event completely changed her life. One day, a friend brought her a newspaper ad, published by a Swiss family looking for a young woman from Quebec to take care of their children and clean their home for one year. Three months after responding to the ad, Monique flew to Switzerland. She explored Europe insatiably. In the end, she stayed for six extra months.

When she returned to Quebec, she earned her degree in arts and literature all while continuing to travel. To this day, she has visited more than 40 countries.

In 2006, while owning a café with her boyfriend at the time, she fell into another period of depression. She admitted that she needed simplicity, travel and authenticity to her therapist who gave her the idea of the Way of St. James. In less than two months, she sold her café and went to Europe alone to walk 1,600 km in eight weeks.

When she returned she didn't have a job but she wanted to continue on her path somehow, so she became a letter carrier for Canada Post.

She discovered mountains later, during her hike of the GR20 in Corsica when she was 34 years old. Monique finally found her peace of mind in this environment.

Her first experience with altitude would be on Kilimanjaro in 2009. After the climb, she did a safari where she came face to face with a leopard, her spirit animal, for the first time.

Upon her return, she dove into lectures about mountaineering, met people from the field, attended conferences and, as soon as possible, joined an expedition to Europe's highest peak, Mount Elbrus, in Russia. Then, on to Mount Everest base camp, the Aconcagua and the rest of the highest peaks in all 7 continents.

She has a ritual of listening to Pink Floyd’s “Learning to Fly” whenever she leaves on an expedition, at the moment of takeoff. Several of her fans encourage her by joining her in this ritual.

Notable ascents

The Seven Summits
Monique Richard completed the Seven Summits in 2012 when she summited Mount Everest.

She completed the seven summits in 32 months, which is the Canadian women's record for the time taken to complete the seven climbs.

The 8000ers 
Monique Richard has participated in five expeditions on 8000 m peaks in the Himalayan and Korakoram ranges.

Everest 

She took part in three expeditions on Mount Everest.

She made her first attempt on Everest on the Nepali side (south face) in October 2011, off-season. Only one other team of mountaineers was on the mountain at that time. In alpine style, she reaches Camp 3 (7,300 m) but turns back because of the weather conditions and the large amounts of snow. During the trek back, she injured her ankle.

On her second expedition in May 2012, she met Norwegian mountaineer Arvid Lahti, who will become her partner for several climbs around the world.

Makalu 

In 2014, she became the first Canadian woman to reach the top of the world's fifth highest mountain, Mt Makalu. She did it at the same time with Al Hancock, who became the first Canadian man to reach this summit. She remains to this day the only Canadian woman to have reached this summit. During this expedition, she comes close to death during the descent because of an airway obstruction while in the death zone.

K2 

In 2015, she made an attempt on K2 where she reached the altitude of 7,300 m. Due to the weather conditions and a series of avalanches, she had to turn back. No team managed to reach the summit that year.

These five climbs were done with the use of supplemental oxygen. On Everest in 2013, she attempted a climb without supplemental oxygen but eventually decided to use it in the upper sections of the mountain. She ultimately decided to turn back very close to the summit, at an altitude of 8,800 m, because of external factors that affected her psychologically; especially the many corpses found on this route back then.

Mount Logan solo 

In 2017, the year of the 150th anniversary of Canada, she made a first attempt on this mountain with a companion. They reached the summit plateau but had to turn back at an altitude of about 5,500 m.

On May 30, 2018, at 2:38 pm, Monique Richard reached the summit of the highest mountain in Canada, Mount Logan, from the west side (Kings Trench).

She is the first woman in the world to have reached the top of this mountain solo. She required a rescue after reaching the summit. Richard's ascent was the first solo to the summit by a woman, though her subsequent rescue leaves the door open for a complete solo ascent and descent.

In 2018, a year much less busy than the previous one, very few teams are on the mountain and she is the first climber flown at base camp. At no point during the expedition that lasted 19 days did another team found themselves in front of her. The solo expedition became a solitary climb.

In the spring of 2018, temperatures are particularly cold in this part of Yukon. To these conditions are added several hardships; broken equipment, fall into a crevasse, storms, avalanches.

After reaching the summit she required a rescue; she descended and made an unexpected detour of several kilometers that forced her to climb a 300 m sub-summit before finding her way. That day she covered a distance of 18 km in 14 hours on the summit plateau and found her bivouac around 1:30 am. The next day, she traversed the summit plateau (about 8 km) and returned to Prospector Col, where, recognizing a deteriorating situation due to weather forecasts, the physical effects of several days of fast ascent from Camp 3, equipment breakdowns and the post-traumatic memories of the tragic events that occurred on Rainier two years before, she made the decision to contact Parks Canada emergency services and request an evacuation.

The evacuation is difficult because Richard is at the operational limit of the aircraft used by the company mandated by Parks Canada for evacuation operations (approximately 5,500 m). Parks Canada then asked two other climbers who were on the mountain to assist Monique Richard so that she could descend to a lower altitude to be evacuated. They managed to reach Richard at her bivouac where they found her weak but conscious and assisted her to ski down to camp 4 from where she was evacuated, at an altitude of about 5,200 m. In order to carry out the evacuation, the operations managers had to purchase additional equipment. The helicopter company has since acquired a new aircraft with a higher operational altitude (an Airbus AS350-B3e Squirrel) which allows it to reach all the upper parts of Mount Logan.

Other ascents 
Since 2009, Monique Richard has reached the summits of the following mountains with an altitude of more than 4,000 m around the world, and made dozens of other lower-altitude climbs in various mountain ranges, including the Canadian Rockies.

Europe

 Mont Blanc, France  4,810 m (see below*)
 Alphubel, Switzerland  4,206 m
 Breithorn, Switzerland  4,164 m
 Castor, Switzerland  4,223 m
 Matterhorn, Switzerland  4,478 m
 Dent Blanche, Switzerland   4,357 m
 Fiescherhorn, Switzerland   4,049 m
 Jungfrau, Switzerland  4,158 m
 Mönch, Switzerland  4,107 m
 Monte Rosa, Switzerland   4,634 m
 Pollux, Switzerland  4,092 m

* In 2011, she climbed Mont Blanc from the Are (1,760 m), without using the Mont-Blanc tramway to approach the Gare du Nid d'Aigle (2,372 m) ). Off-season, she struggled to find a guide, but she manages to find one and they complete the round trip in less than 24 hours by the normal route.

Asia

 Ama Dablam, Nepal   6,812 m
 Imja Tse (Island Peak), Nepal   6,189 m
 Kala Patthar, Nepal  5,643 m
 Lobuche, Nepal  6,120 m

Africa

 Toubkal, Morocco   4,167 m

South America

 Alpamayo, Pérou   5,947 m
 Artesonraju, Pérou  6,025 m

North America

 Rainier, United-States  4,392 m

Tragedy on Mount Rainier 

In 2016, Monique Richard experienced a major incident on Mount Rainier. On March 26, 2016, she and her best friend and mountain partner, Norwegian mountaineer Arvid Lahti, were surprised by an unexpected storm at 3,300 m and remained stuck all night in the cold, in a blizzard and no visibility. Temperatures dropped to -17 C and gusts over 100 km/h swept the mountain.

Unfortunately, her friend did not survive and died in her arms of hypothermia in the early morning. She herself was affected by advanced hypothermia but found the strength to descend to Camp Muir where she was assisted by a team of rescuers who were there for training exercises, then evacuated by a US Armed Forces helicopter.

This tragedy deeply affected the mountaineer. Monique Richard returned to Mount Rainier the following year to install a commemorative plaque near Camp Muir. Since the tragedy, each year Richard commemorates the death of her friend Arvid Lahti on her social media.

A short film produced in 2017 on the life of Monique Richard, "L'affront des cimes", relates this accident and the impact it had on Monique Richard.

Physical training 

Monique Richard is known for her meticulous physical preparation and hard training. Her routine is to get up around 5:15 am to train, which she does between 4 and 5 times a week, for 2 hours a day, including cardio and weight training.

She is known for bringing training equipment during her expeditions to train during periods spent at base camps.

Her physical training is complemented by her work as a letter carrier where she travels about 15 km daily.

Monique Richard attaches great importance to nutrition before and during her expeditions.

She used a hypobaric tent while preparing for her expedition on Everest in 2013.

Conferences 

For several years, Monique Richard has been presenting lectures to various audiences in community, school, college, university and corporate environments to share her passion and inspire people.

Her conferences focus on the themes of motivation, surpassing oneself and self-confidence, the place of women and girls in society, her expeditions, including her solo climb on Mount Logan, health and safety, and on the awareness and the fight against bullying and violence towards children.

Philanthropy 
After her sister was diagnosed with this condition, Monique Richard collaborated with the Quebec Association of Fibromyalgia (now theSociété québécoise de la fibromyalgie) to raise public awareness about this syndrome which affects about 2 to 3% of the Canadian population.

In 2019, Monique Richard decided to join the fight against bullying and violence against children and make this her favorite cause.

Annexes

Filmography 
Documentary : "L'affront des cimes" Film by Florence Pelletier and Caroline Coté (Canada) 2017 – 11 minutes

Documentary 
"Alexis le randonneur" TVA Sports 2019 – 30 minutes

See also 
 Climbing  
 List of climbers and mountaineers
 Eight-thousander

Réferences 

Living people
Canadian mountain climbers
Female climbers
Sportspeople from Montreal
Summiters of the Seven Summits
Summiters of Mount Everest
1975 births